Cédric Aristide N’Doumbé Bosso (often erroneously reported as Cédric N'Doumbé; born 11 October 1990 in Yaoundé) is a Cameroonian professional football player.

Club career
In January 2015, N’Doumbé signed for Algerian club MC Oran.

References

External links
 
 Cédric Aristide N'Doumbé at Foot-National.com

1990 births
Algerian Ligue Professionnelle 1 players
Cameroonian footballers
Nîmes Olympique players
MC Oran players
Expatriate footballers in Algeria
Living people
Trélissac FC players
Association football midfielders